"Beautiful" is a song by Japanese singer-songwriter Miliyah Kato from her debut studio album Rose (2005). The song was written by Minoru Komori and Kato herself, while the production was done by Hiro Matsui. The single was released for the two versions of CD and digital download on 17 November 2004 through Mastersix Foundation as the second single from Rose. The limited version of the CD accompanied the bonus DVD featuring the two music videos, "Beautiful (BR Remix)" and "Yozora".

"Beautiful" is a up-tempo J-pop track with the elements of R&B and hip-hop. The single peaked at number 26 on the Oricon Weekly Singles Chart. The song served as the commercial song to the Lotte chewing gum brand Pure White Gum and the theme song to the Japanese television show Ryuha-R. The single's B-side track, "At the Fever" is a hip-hop track featuring the four Japanese rappers, Twigy, Nipps, Dev Large, and Shinnosk8. The song was later released as the promotional single for 12-inch single on 26 January 2005.

Commercial performance
In Japan, "Beautiful" debuted at its peak, number 28 on Oricon Weekly Singles Chart, with the sales of 6,943 copies. It stayed on the chart for nine weeks, selling 16,272 copies in total.

Track listing

Charts

Weekly charts

Certification and sales

|-
! scope="row"| Japan (RIAJ)
| 
| 16,272 
|-
|}

Release history

References

2004 singles
2004 songs
J-pop songs
Miliyah Kato songs
Mastersix Foundation singles